Tapanila is a neighbourhood in Malmi district, Helsinki. Tapanila has approximately 5474 inhabitants (2005). Tapanila has its own railway station.

It is known that there were few farm houses in Tapanila already in the 16th century. Back then Tapanila was one of the biggest villages in Helsinki area. In 1862, railroad between Hämeenlinna and Tapanila was built. Tapanila was largely rebuilt  from 1910–1935 based on Letchworth Garden City in England, the first in the Garden city movement.  The area was annexed to Helsinki in 1946.

There is also Franzén croft in Tapanila, where, according to auricular tradition, the Finnish national author Aleksis Kivi lived in 1870.

References

Neighbourhoods of Helsinki